Barbadian–Nigerian relations are foreign relations between Barbados and Nigeria. Barbados and Nigeria formally established diplomatic relations on 24 April 1970. Nigeria is accredited to Barbados from its high commission in Port of Spain, (Trinidad and Tobago). Currently the Barbadian Government does not have foreign accreditation for Nigeria, however the Nigerian Government has said that it was highly desirous of Barbados establishing a high commission directly in Nigeria.

History
In 1966 Nigeria was one of fifteen states which took part in U.N. Security Council resolution 230 which admitted Barbados into the United Nations.

In 2006 the Governor Otunba Gbenga Daniel of the Nigerian state of Ogun announced that Barbadians would be given free land if they wished to move to Nigeria. Nigeria has pushed for more investment from Barbadian companies and investors and in 2008 for the establishment of direct flights between both nations.

In 2006 Barbadian solar company  Aqua Sol Components Ltd. formed a 50-50 joint venture partnership with the Nigerian state of Akwa Ibom.  The partnership makes use of Barbados' experience with solar energy given its high usage of solar hot water heaters across the island.  Through the venture, Akwa Ibom hopes to raise the level of solar usage in Nigeria.  The deal was facilitated through Commission for Pan-African Affairs within the Barbados Prime Minister's office.

In 2019 the governments of Barbados and the Federal government of Nigeria signs visa waiver agreements to facilitate ease of travel between their nations. A follow up meeting between the Caribbean Heads of Government in CARICOM and African Union nations was planned for July 2020 however, that summit may be suspended due to the COVID-2019 pandemic.

In 2021, the Central Bank of Nigeria (CBN) formed a partnership with the Barbados-based FINTECH firm Bitt Inc. to develop an e-Naira cryptocurrency to be used in Nigeria.[]

Bilateral agreements

See also 
 Foreign relations of Barbados
 Foreign relations of Nigeria

References

External links 

 
Nigeria
Bilateral relations of Nigeria
Nigeria
Nigeria and the Commonwealth of Nations